Mendota High School is a public high school in Mendota, California, United States, attended largely by Hispanic-Americans.

In the 2015–2016 school year, the school contained 755 students. 99% were Hispanic, with the remainder Asian.

In 2011, the school's 12-person chess team, named the Knuckleheads, placed first in the Premier Division at the CalChess State Championships in Santa Clara, California. Jesus Espinoza was the chess team's mascot. They were honored not only by the City Council but also by the California State Assembly, which caused the Los Angeles Times to remark that for many of the players, that the  trip to Sacramento, California "was the farthest they had ever traveled from Mendota."

The heart and soul of Mendota High School is the football team, which was recently featured in an ESPN Sportscenter special.

References

Public high schools in California
High schools in Fresno County, California
1993 establishments in California